Gary Sherrer is an American Democratic politician from Oklahoma. Sherrer served two terms as Oklahoma Secretary of the Environment under Republican Governors Frank Keating (1995-1997) and Mary Fallin (2011-2013). Sherrer also served as Oklahoma Secretary of Agriculture under Democratic Governor David Walters from 1989 to 1995.

Early life
Sherrer is a graduate of Southeastern Oklahoma State University.  He was a Democratic member of the Oklahoma House of Representatives from 1981 to 1989. After leaving the Legislature, Sherrer served as Director of Legislative and Regulatory Affairs for the Oklahoma Farmers Union and then worked for the Oklahoma Association of Electric Cooperatives.

Cabinet secretary

Walters administration
Governor David Walters appointed Sherrer to serve as the State's first Oklahoma Secretary of Agriculture. Walters also appointed him to concurrently as the Commissioner of the Oklahoma Department of Agriculture. He served in both of those positions from 1991 until the end of Walter's term in 1995.

Keating administration
In 1995, Walters choose not to seek re-election as governor. Frank Keating was elected to succeed him in that position. Keating asked Sherrer to stay on in his Administration. However, instead of Agriculture Secretary, Keating appoint Sherrer to serve as his Oklahoma Secretary of the Environment. In addition to his services as Secretary, the Oklahoma Water Resources Board appointed him to serve as their Executive Director.

Sherrer served in both of those positions until he resigned to return to the private sector in 1997. Governor Keating appointed Brian C. Griffin to succeed Sherrer as Secretary.

Fallin administration
Following the election of Republican Mary Fallin as governor in 2010, Fallin appointed Sherrer to her Taskforce on Economic Development to advise her on matter related to the economy. He served in that position from the entire transition process between Fallin's election in November 2010 and her inauguration in January 2011. On January 14, 2011, Governor Fallin announced that she had selected Sherrer to serve as her Oklahoma Secretary of the Environment in her Cabinet.

While serving in the Fallin Administration, Sherrer led negotiations between Oklahoma and Arkansas to protect the quality of the scenic rivers running through both states. Sherrer oversaw the Oklahoma Department of Wildlife Conservation's efforts to protect the Lesser Prairie Chicken, which avoided the need to place the animal under the protections of the Endangered Species Act by the United States Fish and Wildlife Service. Sherrer also  oversaw the Oklahoma Department of Environmental Quality as it returned to compliance with the federal Safe Drinking Water Act. The compliance measures allowed the state to regain control over water quality in the state rather than the Environmental Protection Agency. After two and a half years as Environmental Secretary, Sherrer resigned his position to return to private life.

Private sector
Following his resignation, Sherrer went to work for KAMO, a Vinita, Oklahoma-based power provider for northeast Oklahoma and southeast Missouri. He served as that organization's chief administrative officer and assistance chief executive officer.

Sherrer currently serves as assistant vice president for external relations in Oklahoma State University’s Division of Agricultural Sciences and Natural Resources. He also serves on the board of directors at Rural Enterprises of Oklahoma, Inc., a provider of economic development services to rural Oklahomans.

References

State cabinet secretaries of Oklahoma
Living people
Democratic Party members of the Oklahoma House of Representatives
Heads of Oklahoma state agencies
People from Vinita, Oklahoma
Year of birth missing (living people)